The White Paper on District Administration in Hong Kong (《地方行政白皮書》）was a white paper published by the Hong Kong Government in January 1981 on introducing elected bodies to local administration in Hong Kong and widening the electoral franchise of the Urban Council.

Green Paper
The Green Paper: A Pattern of District Administration in Hong Kong was published on 6 June 1980 for public consultations on reforming local administration in Hong Kong. The Green Paper recommended that:

On the local tier of administration:
 District Management Committees be established in each district;
 District Boards (區議會) be established in each district; and
 some members of District Boards would be returned by elections

On the mid-tier Urban Council:
 the number of appointed members in the Urban Council be increased to 15 to maintain the pre-existing ratio between appointed and elected members;
 8 constituencies be created for the Urban Council, with 7 multi-member constituencies and 1 single-member constituency; and
 1-2 constituencies in each district; each constituency represents 250,000

White Paper
Upon the conclusion of public consultations, the White Paper: District Administration in Hong Kong was published in January 1981, stating that the government would:
 Maintain the pre-existing administrative division comprising 18 districts;
 Establish District Management Committees in each district by 1981, to be formed by government officials across departments;
 Establish District Boards in each district by March 1982 (Boards in New Territories to be established by reconstituting existing District Consultation Committees); and
 Expand Suffrage for the Urban Council

Implementation
Proposals in the White Paper were implemented between 1982 and 1983, during which elections to the District Boards and Urban Council were held.

Expansion of Electoral Franchise
Before 1981, Hong Kong residents were eligible to vote in Urban Council elections only if they:
 had reached 21 years of age;
 had ordinary resided in Hong Kong for the 3 years immediately preceding the nomination; and
 were qualified in at least one of 23 categories, which included educational qualifications (School Certificate Examination or equivalent), be a juror, salaried taxpayer, or a member of certain professional organisations

The electoral franchise were expanded to around 568,000 voters upon implementation of the White Paper, which marked an increase by 17 times:
 minimum voting age to remain at 21;
 minimum period of ordinary residence in Hong Kong increased from 3 to 7 years;
 all residents were eligible for suffrage regardless of nationalities; and
 the 23 criteria for registering as voters in Urban Council elections abolished.

District Board Bill 1981
The Bill provided for the formation of District Boards:
 to be composed of elected members, appointed or elected members of the Urban Council or chairmen of Rural Committees, appointed unofficial members and main official members of corresponding District Management Committees;
 to be formed by around 25-30 members, with an unofficial majority;
 to be initially chaired by officials, but chairmen to be elected among members as soon as possible; and
 with 1-2 members per constituency, elected through first-past-the-post voting or single non-transferable vote.

Upon enactment of the District Board Ordinance (Cap. 366) on 17 July 1981, elections for District Boards on Hong Kong Island and in Kowloon were held on 4 March 1982, while elections for District Boards in the New Territories were held on 23 September 1982.

Urban Council (Amendment) Bill 1981
The Bill provided for the expansion of electoral franchise and creation of constituencies to the Urban Council election on 8 March 1983:
 number of elected and appointed UC members increased from 12 to 15 members each;
 15 single-member constituencies created (each of 250,000 population), elected through first-past-the-post voting; and
 the term of UC members elected in 1981 shortened to 2 years to accommodate Urban Council elections under the reformed electoral methods in 1983.

See also
 District Councils of Hong Kong
 Urban Council
 1982 Hong Kong local elections
 1983 Hong Kong municipal election

References

Politics of Hong Kong
1980 in Hong Kong
1981 in Hong Kong
Electoral reform in Hong Kong
History of Hong Kong
1980 in politics
1981 in politics
Hong Kong legislation